Rastislav Revúcky (born 17 May 1978) is a former Slovakian para table tennis player who has won four European titles in his career along with Ján Riapoš in team events.

References

1978 births
Living people
Paralympic table tennis players of Slovakia
Medalists at the 2004 Summer Paralympics
Medalists at the 2012 Summer Paralympics
Table tennis players at the 2004 Summer Paralympics
Table tennis players at the 2008 Summer Paralympics
Table tennis players at the 2012 Summer Paralympics
Table tennis players at the 2016 Summer Paralympics
People from Rožňava
Medalists at the 2008 Summer Paralympics
Paralympic medalists in table tennis
Paralympic gold medalists for Slovakia
Paralympic silver medalists for Slovakia
Slovak male table tennis players